Brigadier George James Stewart Chatterton DSO, OBE (2 December 1911 – 12 November 1987) was a soldier in the British Army who commanded the Glider Pilot Regiment during World War II.

Early life and education
Chatterton was educated at Pangbourne College from 1925 to 1929; he was Chief of the College (equivalent to Head Boy).

Career
Chatterton reached the rank of Brigadier, and was known for being operational commander of the Glider Pilot Regiment during the Second World War. He was awarded the DSO in 1943. After the war, he became a stockjobber, and later devoted his time to serving as Chairman of, and fundraising over £1 million for, the Lady Hoare Thalidomide Trust. He was awarded OBE in the 1980 Birthday Honours.

In 1959 he narrated a short film by the London County Council about the education of deaf children, called 'Silent Hope'. His memoir, The Wings of Pegasus, was published in 1962.

In 1979, he appeared, alongside his wife, in a documentary called ‘The Buddha Comes to Sussex’, in which a group of Theravada Buddhist monks are setting up a new monastery in his local area.

Chatterton lived at Midhurst, in West Sussex; he died 12 November 1987.

References

Bibliography

External links
 Biography on Glider Pilot Regiment website

Glider Pilot Regiment officers
British Army personnel of World War II
Royal Air Force officers
Queen's Royal Regiment officers
Companions of the Distinguished Service Order
Officers of the Order of the British Empire
1987 deaths
1911 births
British Army brigadiers